Port Hope is a municipality in Southern Ontario, Canada, approximately  east of Toronto and about  west of Kingston. It is located at the mouth of the Ganaraska River on the north shore of Lake Ontario, in the west end of Northumberland County. The private Trinity College School opened here in 1868.

History
Cayuga people, one of the Six Nations of the Iroquois Confederacy, migrated to the Port Hope area from New York state in 1779. They had been forced from their homeland south of the Great Lakes after having been allies of the British during the American Revolution. Great Britain had ceded these lands, along with territory it occupied in the Thirteen Colonies east of the Mississippi River, after the United States won independence. 

In 1793, United Empire Loyalists from the northern colonies became the first permanent settlers of European heritage in Port Hope, as the Crown granted them land as compensation for being forced to leave the colonies (much of their property was confiscated by rebel governments) and as payment for military service. The new colonists called the settlement Smith's Creek after a former fur trader. They developed mills and a town plot by the turn of the century.

After the War of 1812, the Crown tried to recruit more British settlers, and townspeople wanted a new name. After a brief fling with the name Toronto, the village was renamed in 1817 as Port Hope, after the Township of Hope of which it was a part. That was the namesake of Colonel Henry Hope, lieutenant governor of the Province of Quebec. The post office dates from 1820. In 1834 Port Hope was incorporated as a town.

Relatively slow growth from 1881 to 1951 resulted in much of the town's 19th century architecture surviving. In the early 21st century, Port Hope's downtown is celebrated as the best-preserved 19th-century streetscape in the province of Ontario. The town's local chapter of the Architectural Conservancy of Ontario and the Heritage Port Hope Advisory Committee are very active and advise on the restoration and preservation of architecturally or historically significant buildings.

With over 270 heritage-designated buildings throughout the municipality, Port Hope has a higher per capita rate of preservation than any other town or city in Canada. Downtown businesses are regulated by the municipality to maintain the town's unique character. This special character makes Port Hope a destination for heritage tourism and people interested in architecture.

On January 1, 2001, the original town amalgamated with Hope Township to form the Municipality of Port Hope and Hope, which was renamed to its current name in November of that same year. Prior to amalgamation, the town's census population was listed as 11,718 while the township's was 3,877.

The 2017 horror movie It and its 2019 sequel It Chapter Two were both filmed in Port Hope, which portrayed the fictional town of Derry, Maine.

Radiation and cleanup
Port Hope is known for having the largest volume of historic low-level radioactive wastes in Canada. These wastes were initially created by Eldorado Mining and Refining Limited and its private sector predecessors, resulting from the refining of radium from pitchblende. Radium was used in radioluminescent paint (such as aircraft dials), and in early treatments for cancer.

During World War II, the Eldorado plant produced exponentially more uranium oxides, which the United States used in the Manhattan Project that created the first nuclear weapons. This plant, now under the ownership of Cameco, continues to produce uranium fuel for nuclear power plants.

In 2002, a large amount of contaminated soil was removed from beachfront areas. More recently, a testing program began of over 5,000 properties, with a plan to remove and store contaminated soil that had been used as landfill. Over a billion dollars is expected to be spent on the soil remediation project, the largest such cleanup in Canadian history.

Geography

Communities
Besides the town proper of Port Hope, the municipality of Port Hope comprises a number of villages and hamlets, including Campbellcroft, Canton, Dale, Davidson's Corners (partially), Decker Hollow (ghost town), Elizabethville, Garden Hill, Knoxville, Morrish, Osaca, Perrytown, Port Britain, Rossmount (partially), Tinkerville, Thomstown, Welcome, Wesleyville, and Zion.

Climate
Port Hope has a humid continental climate (Dfb) with warm summers and cold winters.

Demographics

Mother tongue spoken:
 English as first language: 94.7%
 French as first language: 1.0%
 English and French as first language: 0%
 Other as first language: 4.3%

Economy

Downtown Port Hope offers shopping and a historic main street. Port Hope is served by a Via Rail station. It has a medical centre, a walk-in clinic, and a community health centre. It has had a daily newspaper since 1878, the Port Hope Evening Guide. Until 2007, this was part of the Osprey Media chain and subsequently a part of the Sun Media organization. In 2009 the newspaper was amalgamated with the Cobourg Daily Star and renamed as Northumberland Today.com. In November 2017 the newspaper was included in the large-scale closing of many local community newspapers throughout the province of Ontario.

Port Hope's Economic Development Strategic Plan aims to increase job growth at least as fast as population growth. The town has a variety of industries.

Arts and culture

The Ganaraska River (affectionately known as "The Ganny"), is well known to area anglers for annual salmon and trout runs. It has caused many historic floods, the most recent having occurred on March 21–22, 1980. Every April since until 2020, Port Hope has commemorated the flood with "Float Your Fanny Down the Ganny" ten kilometre boat race. "Participants range from serious paddlers navigating the cold, fast-moving water in kayaks and canoes, to the very entertaining 'crazy craft' paddlers, floating any combination of materials down the river in an attempt to reach the finish line." Due to the COVID-19 pandemic, the event was cancelled in 2020 and 2021, the first time in its history for such action.

Attractions
The Capitol Theatre is Canada's last functioning atmospheric theatre. The theatre's main auditorium is styled after an outdoor medieval courtyard and rolling clouds are projected onto the ceiling. The town spent in excess of three million dollars renovating and upgrading the theatre in 2004–2005. It is also used for live events by Port Hope Festival Theatre.

The Municipality of Port Hope is home to many heritage and cultural attractions, and events, including:

 Float Your Fanny Down the Ganny—a water race commemorating the 1980 flood of the Ganaraska River
 Ganaraska Forest Centre
 Canadian Firefighters Museum
 Port Hope Yacht Club
 Port Hope Festival Theatre at the Capitol Theatre
 La Jeunesse Youth Orchestra  (3 concerts per year)
 Port Hope and District Agricultural Fall Fair
 The All Canadian Jazz Festival
 Port Hope Farmers' Market (May to October)
 Port Hope Christmas and Santa Claus Parade (includes Festival of Trees, Candlelight Walk to Memorial Park, and Carol Singing)
 Port Hope Drive-In (Built in 1952, it is among the oldest Canadian drive-ins still operating)
 Architectural Conservancy of Ontario Annual House Tour, Garden Tour, and Antiques and Artifacts Auction
 Port Hope and District Historical Society Dorothy's House Museum
 Port Hope Archives
 Friends of Wesleyville Village
 Beaches:West Beach (parking at the end of Marsh Street)East Beach (parking at the bottom of King Street at Madison Street)
 Port Hope Waterfront Trail
 Port Hope Golf and Country Club

Infrastructure

Transportation
Highway 401 runs through the north end of Port Hope, with exits at County Road 2/Toronto Road (461) and Highway 28/Ontario Street (464).

Port Hope Transit provides local bus service, and VIA Rail provides passenger service from the Port Hope railway station along the Toronto-Montreal corridor. The station was built in 1856 for the Grand Trunk Railway and later CN Rail. It was restored in 1985.

Pleasure boats dock at the foot of John Street at Hayward Street and share the facilities with Cameco, which has berths for freighters servicing their manufacturing facilities at the mouth of the Ganaraska River.

Education
Public education in Port Hope is under the management of the Kawartha Pine Ridge District School Board, and Catholic education is by the Peterborough Victoria Northumberland and Clarington Catholic District School Board.

Elementary schools
 St. Anthony's Elementary School, Catholic JK–8
 Ganaraska Trail Public School, Public JK–6
 North Hope Central School, Public JK–6
 Beatrice Strong Public School, Public JK–6

High schools
 Port Hope High School c. 1871, Public Gr 9-12 - opened in 1853 as Port Hope Grammar School
 Dr M. S. Hawkins Senior Public School, Public Gr 7–8 (same building as Port Hope High School)
 Port Hope High School Student to Work Transition Program (SWOT Campus), Public Grade 9–12
 Trinity College School, Private Gr 5–12
 Discovery Academy, International campus (not active)

Notable people
 David Blackwood, artist.
 Lew Cirne, pioneer of Application Performance Management, founder of Wily Technology and New Relic.
 William Henry Draper, lawyer, judge, and politician.
 Sue Gardner, executive director of the Wikimedia Foundation.
 J.J. Hagerman, Colorado railroad and mining magnate who went on to become one of founders of New Mexico.
 William Leonard Hunt ("The Great Farini"), entertainer.
 Archibald Cameron Macdonell, commander of the 1st Canadian Division during the First World War.
 Charles Vincent Massey, first Canadian-born Governor General of Canada.
 Claire Mowat, writer.
 Farley Mowat, conservationist and writer.
 Dennis O'Brien, NHL hockey player.
 Shane O'Brien, NHL hockey player.
 Cal Quantrill, Major League Baseball player.
 Paul Quantrill, Major League Baseball player.
 Jim Roberts, NHL hockey player.
 Wade Rowland, writer and journalist.
 Joseph M. Scriven, author of the hymn "What a Friend We Have in Jesus".
 William Sims, U.S. Naval Admiral, awarded 1921 Pulitzer Prize for History.
 Ron Smith, NHL hockey player.
 Ambrose Thomas Stanton, Chief Medical Officer for the British colonies. Born in Kendal and attended Port Hope High School.
 Paul Terbenche, NHL hockey player.
 Arthur Trefusis Heneage Williams, politician.
 Major-General Arthur Victor Seymour Williams.

See also
List of townships in Ontario

References

External links

 

Lower-tier municipalities in Ontario
Municipalities in Northumberland County, Ontario
Populated places on Lake Ontario in Canada